Logan Canyon is in the western United States in northeastern Utah, a canyon that cuts its way through the Bear River Mountains, a branch of the Wasatch Range. It is popular for both summer and winter activities, especially rock-climbing, hiking, camping, fishing, snowmobiling, and skiing, at the Beaver Mountain ski resort. Just beyond the summit is a steep road leading into Bear Lake Valley and scenic overlooks that provide views of deep blue Bear Lake. The western terminus is at Logan in Cache County and the eastern terminus is at Garden City in Rich County.

Scenic Byway

U.S. Route 89 through the canyon has been designated a National Scenic Byway and connects the Cache and Bear Lake valleys.

Recent construction and proposed enhancements to the highway have been the focus of a decades-long confrontation between environmentalists and the Utah Department of Transportation. Some of the improvements have included reconstructing the bridges, which were in poor shape, straightening the road leading to Bear Lake, and reconstructing the Bear Lake Overlook, making it much larger and more attractive and adding basic facilities. The highway is the site of many serious and even fatal traffic accidents given the winding nature of the canyon, the drastic elevation changes, and the poor driving conditions encountered during winter weather.

Attractions
At the mouth of Logan Canyon along the River Trail is the Allen and Alice Stokes Nature Center, a local nonprofit and free nature center, and official educational permittee of the Uinta-Wasatch-Cache National Forest. They offer workshops, hikes, and classes which vary by season.

Among the most famous hiking trails is the treacherous Crimson Trail. It begins at Spring Hollow Campground and ends at Guinivah Campground and is noted for its views, including the 'China Wall' formation. Another popular trail is the Wind Cave trail, which leads to the Wind Caves, a formation of 3 arches in the weathered limestone bedrock, and from which there are views of the China Wall.

Tony Grove Lake Area is situated on the Logan canyon scenic byway. A seven-mile paved road climbs to a height of 8050 feet (2454 m) to reach Tony Grove Lake and the Mount Naomi Wilderness area. The area around this glacial lake explodes into wildflowers in the early summer.

The Logan River runs south to southwest through most of the canyon into Cache Valley and is popular for fishing. The river is dammed in three locations near the western mouth of the canyon.

The Beaver Mountain ski area is located just a mile off the highway, a few miles past the midway point from Logan to Bear Lake.

References

External links

 Utah Scenic Byways by Utah office of Tourism
 Logan Canyon Scenic Byway by U.S. Department of Transportation National Scenic Byways Program (archived 2013)
 A series of interviews about Logan Canyon from the Logan Canyon Reflections Digital Collection: Utah State University
 Stokes Nature Center official website

Bear River (Great Salt Lake)
Canyons and gorges of Utah
Landforms of Cache County, Utah
Landforms of Rich County, Utah
U.S. Route 89
Tourist attractions in Rich County, Utah
Tourist attractions in Cache County, Utah